Sadayampattu is a village in Kallakurichi district of Tamil Nadu, India. The entire village is surrounded by 3 lakes and in the middle of the village is the Gomukhi river. People are engaged with agricultural activities, the main crops are paddy, sugarcane, cotton, sago and others.

Villages in Kallakurichi district